The Rt Rev  Ralph Vernon Matthews (3 April 1928 – 4 March 1983) was the 11th Anglican Bishop of Waiapu, New Zealand, whose brief Episcopate spanned a four-year period during the third quarter of the 20th century.

He was educated at Napier Boys' High School and the University of Auckland, and was ordained in 1956. He embarked on his ecclesiastical career with a curacy in Hastings, New Zealand, after which he was Vicar of Waipukurau, then Taupo. From 1976 to 1979 he was Archdeacon of Waiapu, before his consecration to the Episcopate as its Diocesan Bishop, which See he held until his untimely death.

References

1928 births
People educated at Napier Boys' High School
University of Auckland alumni
Anglican archdeacons in New Zealand
Anglican bishops of Waiapu
20th-century Anglican bishops in New Zealand
1983 deaths